"Noticed" is a song by American rapper Lil Mosey. It was released on July 20, 2018, and is the third single from Mosey's debut studio album Northsbest. Produced by Royce David, who produced most of the tracks on Northsbest, the song peaked at number 80 on the US Billboard Hot 100.  It was named one of the five hip hop singles to watch of fall 2018 by Forbes. The track was also noted for its lyrical references to and presence of lean on the cover art and in its video. "Noticed" has gone on to become one of Mosey's most popular songs, and is his second most streamed song on Spotify, only behind "Blueberry Faygo".

Composition
Forbes called the track a "rap-sung hybrid". "Noticed" also makes use of Auto-Tune on Mosey's vocals. Lyrically, Lil Mosey boasts about how much he earns and the changes in his lifestyle. In an interview with Genius, Mosey stated that another, slower version of the song was released in 2017, but was copyrighted. The new version was more fast-paced, and interpolates the original with the lines: "Yeah, Grew on 50 Avenue, tweakers layed up next to dude/Need a bigger revenue, so I stay tryna sell to you/****** always testin' me, so I stay with the .32/You can't hang with bros and me, 'cause we gon' blast that .22/You knew *****, I said you knew/I turn heads when I, roll through yeah/You know I'm with, with the crew yeah/Circle small, so it''s just 2 times 2, yeah". Mosey and David then decided to remake the song. The original version is still available through SoundCloud, and Mosey's YouTube channel.

Music video
The video was directed by Cole Bennett and features Lil Mosey showing off his "flashy lifestyle" including his jewelry and cars, as well as lying in bed next to a girl and waking up in a condo located in the mountains. The music video has almost 290 million views and is one of the most viewed music videos on Lyrical Lemonade's YouTube channel.

Personnel
Credits adapted from the album's liner notes and Tidal.

 Royce David – production, composition, mixing, studio personnel

Charts

Certifications

References

2018 singles
2018 songs
Lil Mosey songs
Interscope Records singles
Music videos directed by Cole Bennett